Hapjeong Station is a subterranean station of Seoul Subway Line 2 and Seoul Subway Line 6. The station is located just north of the Han River in Mapo-gu. The name of the subway station comes from its local name. The name of the area means clam well.

The station is the southern end of Hongdae area, which is the centre of urban arts and indie music culture of Seoul. It is closest to the historical site of Jeoldu-san, a place where over 10,000 Koreans of the Roman Catholic faith were beheaded in 1866 under the orders of Daewon-gun. Yanghwajin Foreigners' Cemetery and the Holt International Children's Services are also located near the station. The northern end of Yanghwa Bridge is near the gates of the station.

Trivia 
The song "Hapjeong Station Exit 5" (합정역 5번 출구), by Yoo Jae-suk, is about a pair of lovers who meet at Hapjeong station for the last time before breaking up.

Gallery

References 

Metro stations in Mapo District
Seoul Metropolitan Subway stations
Railway stations opened in 1984
1984 establishments in South Korea
20th-century architecture in South Korea